Abdikarim Ahmed Mooge Liibaan is a Somaliland politician and is the current Mayor of Hargeisa, the largest city and capital of Somaliland. He belongs to the Eidagale sub-division of the Garhajis Isaaq clan.

Early life 
Abdikarim was born in 1974 in Sin-ujiif, a village in the outskirts of Garowe, Somalia. Abdikarim is the son of famous Somali artist Ahmed Mooge Liibaan and nephew of famous Somali artist Mohamed Mooge Liibaan. He grew up in Hargeisa, where he completed his primary and secondary education. At the outbreak of clashes in Hargeisa during the Somaliland War of Independence, Abdikarim fled to Ethiopia, specifically the Kaam-Abokor refugee camp.

Upon his return to Somaliland, he and several other youth founded the HAVAYOCO agency, with the goal of supporting vulnerable people and youth. He later worked for UN agencies and international organizations, where he moved abroad and spent some of his life, but later returned to Hargeisa.

Political career 
During the Silanyo administration, Abdikarim served in two positions; as the Deputy Minister of National Planning and as the Deputy Minister of Fisheries, but he later resigned.

Abdikarim is a member of the Waddani party, the largest opposition party in Somaliland. He succeeded the previous mayor Abdurrahman Mahmoud Aidiid as the mayor of Hargeisa after the 2021 Somaliland municipal elections, gaining the most votes out of all candidates in Hargeisa.

References

Living people
Ethnic Somali people
Mayors of Hargeisa
Peace, Unity, and Development Party politicians
People from Hargeisa
1974 births